Electrics may mean:

 Electric vehicle which is propelled by one or more electric motors, using energy stored in rechargeable batteries
 Electrical wiring installed in a building
 Electrical network or circuit of any kind

In music
 "Electrics", a song on Listen, A Flock of Seagulls album